The Shire of Otway was a local government area about  southwest of Melbourne, the state capital of Victoria, Australia.

History

Otway was incorporated as a shire on 6 May 1919, carved out of parts of the Shires of Colac, Heytesbury and Winchelsea. In 1964, it annexed further parts of Heytesbury (in Coradjil Parish) and Winchelsea (in Kanglang Parish). In 1969, it lost the town of Simpson to Heytesbury.

On 23 September 1994, the Shire of Otway was abolished, and along with the City of Colac and parts of the Shires of Colac, Heytesbury and Winchelsea, was merged into the newly created Shire of Colac Otway. The township of Princetown merged west into the newly created Shire of Corangamite.

Wards

The Shire of Otway was divided into four ridings in 1987, each of which elected three councillors:
 Apollo Bay Riding
 Coastal Riding
 Central Riding
 West Riding

Towns and localities
 Apollo Bay
 Barham Paradise
 Beech Forest*
 Cape Otway
 Carlisle River
 Forrest
 Gellibrand
 Glenaire
 Hordern Vale
 Johanna
 Kennett River
 Lavers Hill
 Marengo
 Princetown
 Skenes Creek
 Wye River
 Wyelangta
 Yuulong

* Council seat.

Population

* Estimate in the 1958 Victorian Year Book.

References

External links
 Victorian Places - Otways and Otway Shire

Otway
Otway Ranges